Strother Madison Stockslager (May 7, 1842 – June 1, 1930) was an American lawyer, Civil War veteran, and politician who served two terms as a U.S. Representative from Indiana from 1881 to 1885.

Biography 
Born in Mauckport, Indiana, Stockslager attended the common schools, Corydon High School, and Indiana University at Bloomington.
He taught school.

He served in the Union Army during the Civil War as second lieutenant and captain in the Thirteenth Indiana Volunteer Cavalry, which he had assisted to organize.
He was mustered out as captain and returned to Mauckport.

He served as Deputy county auditor of Harrison County, 1866–1868, then as Deputy county clerk of Harrison County, 1868-1870.

He was appointed by President Andrew Johnson as assessor of internal revenue in 1867, but was not confirmed by the United States Senate.
He studied law.
He was admitted to the bar in Corydon, Indiana, in 1871 and practiced in Indiana and Kentucky.
He served as member of the State senate 1874-1878.
He was editor of the Corydon Democrat 1879-1882.

Congress 
Stockslager was elected as a Democrat to the Forty-seventh and Forty-eighth Congresses (March 4, 1881 – March 3, 1885).
He served as chairman of the Committee on Public Buildings and Grounds (Forty-eighth Congress).
He was an unsuccessful candidate for renomination in 1884 to the Forty-ninth Congress.

Later career and death 
He resumed the practice of law in Corydon.
He was appointed assistant commissioner of the General Land Office on October 1, 1885, and commissioner on March 27, 1888.
He resigned March 4, 1889, but remained in charge until June 20, 1889.
He continued the practice of law in Washington, D.C.

He was an unsuccessful Democratic candidate for election in 1894 to the Fifty-fourth Congress.
He served as delegate to the Democratic National Convention in 1896.
He served as legal expert in the Department of Labor in 1918.

He resumed the practice of law in Washington, D.C., until his death there on June 1, 1930.
He was interred in Arlington National Cemetery.

References
 Retrieved on 2009-5-11

External links

1842 births
1930 deaths
People from Harrison County, Indiana
People of Indiana in the American Civil War
Burials at Arlington National Cemetery
General Land Office Commissioners
Democratic Party members of the United States House of Representatives from Indiana
19th-century American politicians
19th-century American lawyers
20th-century American lawyers
Democratic Party Indiana state senators
Indiana lawyers